Kyle Walker is an American politician serving as a member of the Indiana Senate from Senate District 31. He assumed office on November 17, 2020.

Education 
A native of Indianapolis, Walker graduated from Lawrence North High School and earned a Bachelor of Science degree in business management from Indiana Wesleyan University in 2005.

Career 
In 2007 and 2008, Walker worked as executive director of the Marion County Republican Central Committee. In 2008 and 2009, he worked as deputy director of the Indianapolis Department of Public Works for policy and planning. He also worked as the business development manager of Commonwealth Engineers, an engineering consulting firm. He served as chair of the Marion County Republican Central Committee from 2010 to 2015 and founded his own consulting company in 2010. Walker was elected to the Indiana Senate by a caucus of Precinct Committee representatives to fill a vacancy in November 2020.

During the 2022 legislative session, Walker supported a $1.1 billion income tax cut for Hoosiers. He authored several bills to improve public safety, including legislation to strengthen electronic monitoring of offenders so they can't go on to commit additional crimes. He also authored economic development legislation to help Indiana communities attract sports, tourism and convention events. Walker also led a bipartisan effort to help Indiana foster youth access and afford a driver's license and car insurance.

In 2021, Walker sponsored legislation creating the Indiana Crime Guns Task Force to allow regional law enforcement agencies to work together to track guns used to commit crimes across Central Indiana and help bring more violent criminals to justice. Since its creation, the Task Force has seized 369 illegal firearms leading to the arrests of 397 violent criminals.

In his campaign for re-election, Walker has been endorsed by the Indiana Chamber of Commerce  and the Indy Chamber BAC for his support of pro-business policies. Walker has also been endorsed by several state and local law enforcement and first responder organizations, including the Indiana State Fraternal Order of Police, the Indiana Fire Chiefs Association and the Indiana Professional Firefighters PAC  as well as the Fishers Fraternal Order of Police Lodge 199 and the Lawrence Fraternal Order of Police Lodge 159. Walker has also received endorsements from labor unions including the Indiana AFL-CIO and the Indiana State Pipe Trades Association.

In February 2022, Walker voted against a bill that would prevent transgender athletes from competing in school sports that match their gender identity. In March 2022, he voted against a bill that would repeal Indiana's requirement for a permit to carry a handgun in public places. In August 2022, Walker voted against a near total abortion ban in Indiana, after he expressed his opposition in July to a first trimester ban without reasonable exceptions for rape, incest, health of the mother and cases of fatal fetal anomaly.

References 

Living people
Indiana Wesleyan University alumni
Republican Party Indiana state senators
People from Indianapolis
Politicians from Indianapolis
Year of birth missing (living people)